Pussyfoot is a 1970s British recording act.

Pussyfoot may also refer to:

 Pussyfoot (film), 2008 comedy
 Pussyfoot 5, British comic series
 The Age of the Pussyfoot, 1966 science fiction novel by Frederick Pohl
 Marc Antony and Pussyfoot, Warner Brothers cartoon characters
 (No Pussyfooting), 1973 studio album by Fripp & Eno
 William E. Johnson (prohibitionist) (1862-1945), American prohibitionist and The Pussyfoot, the non-alcoholic drink named after him
 "The Flying Pussyfoot", a transcontinental train featured in the Japanese series Baccano!
 Pussyfoot, a fictional character played by Harry Scott of the British comedy duo Scott and Whaley
 Pussyfoot Records (1994-2002), a Howie B record label